The third  and final season of the Fox American television psychological thriller series The Following premiered on March 2, 2015 and concluded on May 18, 2015 with a total of 15 episodes.

Cast

Main cast
 Kevin Bacon as Ryan Hardy, a former FBI agent (15 episodes)
 Shawn Ashmore as Mike Weston, a young FBI agent (15 episodes)
 Jessica Stroup as Max Hardy, a young FBI agent and Ryan Hardy's niece (15 episodes)
 Sam Underwood as Mark Gray, follower and son of deceased Lily Gray and identical twin of deceased Luke (9 episodes)
 Zuleikha Robinson as Gwen, love interest of Ryan Hardy (15 episodes)
 Gregg Henry as Dr. Arthur Strauss, Joe Carroll's mentor who introduced him into killing (4 episodes)
 Michael Ealy as Theo Noble (10 episodes)
 James Purefoy as Joe Carroll, a serial killer and cult leader on death row (9 episodes)

Recurring
 Ruth Kearney as Daisy (11 episodes)
 Gbenga Akinnagbe as Tom Reyes, Max's boyfriend (10 episodes)
 Monique Gabriela Curnen as Erin Sloan, an FBI tech analyst (10 episodes)
 Valerie Cruz as Agent Mendez, lead FBI agent (7 episodes)
 Diane Neal as FBI Agent Lisa Campbell (5 episodes)
 Hunter Parrish as Kyle (5 episodes)
 Megalyn Echikunwoke as Penny Tyler, Theo's sister (5 episodes)
 Mike Colter as Nick Donovan, a returning FBI agent who assumes command of the FBI team (3 episodes)
 Susan Kelechi Watson as Cindy Noble, Theo's wife (3 episodes)
 Annet Mahendru as Eliza (4 episodes)

Guest stars
 Felix Solis as Agent Clarke, FBI Director (2 episodes)
 Michael Irby as Andrew, follower of Mark (2 episodes)
 Glenn Fleshler as Neil, former student of Dr. Strauss (2 episodes)
 Robin Weigert as Judge Wallace (2 episodes)
 Tim Guinee as Duncan Banks (2 episodes)
 Allison Mack as Hilary, a local police officer who assists the FBI (1 episode)
 David Pittu

Episodes

Ratings

References

External links 
 
 

2015 American television seasons
The Following